Jim's Atonement is a 1912 American drama film. It was produced by the Independent Moving Pictures (IMP) Company of New York, and was one of the first directorial efforts of actor Edward LeSaint.

Trivia
Harry A. Pollard and Margarita Fischer, who play the married couple Jim and Molly in this film, were actually husband and wife in real life.

References

External links
 

Films directed by Edward LeSaint
1912 drama films
1912 films
1910s American films